Sazman-i Nasr was a Hazara militant group, opposed to the leftist Afghan government during the 1980s. After the Revolutionary Council of Islamic Unity of Afghanistan, Al-Nasr was the elite militant group. The organisation included many young men educated in Kabul, including Shia clergymen, and received support from the Khomeini government. It was a part of the Tehran Eight political constellation after 1987.

References

Nasr
Rebel groups in Afghanistan
Shia Islamist groups